Cecil James Cooper (21 February 1926 – 14 June 2010) was an Australian professional rugby league footballer who played in the 1940s and 1950s, and coached in the 1950s.

A New South Wales representative , he captained and later coached the Canterbury-Bankstown club of the New South Wales Rugby Football League. He is the brother of Australian international Lionel Cooper and fellow Canterbury-Bankstown players Col Cooper and Reg Cooper. In 1953, when captain of his club, Cec Cooper  suffered a fractured spine.

Cooper died on 14 June 2010, at the age of 84.

References

1926 births
2010 deaths
Australian rugby league players
Australian rugby league coaches
Canterbury-Bankstown Bulldogs captains
Canterbury-Bankstown Bulldogs coaches
Canterbury-Bankstown Bulldogs players
Rugby league centres
Rugby league players from New South Wales